Thomas Smith (fl. 1382–1399), of Great Bedwyn, Wiltshire, was an English politician.

He was a smith and a Member (MP) of the Parliament of England for Great Bedwyn in May 1382, October 1382, February 1383, October 1383, April 1384, 1385 and 1399.

References

Year of birth missing
Year of death missing
English MPs May 1382
English MPs October 1382
Members of Parliament for Great Bedwyn
English MPs February 1383
English MPs October 1383
English MPs April 1384
English MPs 1385
English MPs 1399